František Dušek was a Bohemian fencer. He competed in the individual épée and sabre events at the 1908 Summer Olympics.

References

Year of birth missing
Year of death missing
Czech male fencers
Olympic fencers of Bohemia
Fencers at the 1908 Summer Olympics